Events from the year 1997 in Belgium

Incumbents
Monarch: Albert II
Prime Minister: Jean-Luc Dehaene

Events
 27 February – Closure of Vilvoorde Renault Factory announced, with a loss of 3,100 jobs, inspiring the following year's Procédure Renault, a new consultation procedure for mass redundancies.

Publications
 Bianca Booms and Jean-Paul Wydoodt, Alcohol, illegale drugs en medicatie: Recente ontwikkelingen in Vlaanderen, 1996.

Births
 1 July – Eléonor Sana, skier
 15 October – Romanie Schotte, Miss Belgium 2017
 30 September – Max Verstappen, racing driver and the 2021 Formula  One World Champion

Deaths
 5 January – André Franquin (born 1924), comics artist
 19 January – Robert-Joseph Mathen (born 1916), bishop
 15 June – Edmond Leburton (born 1915), prime minister

References

 
Belgium
Years of the 20th century in Belgium
1990s in Belgium
Belgium